Spangled Unicorn is a composition for brass ensemble by the British-born composer Anna Clyne.  The work was commissioned by the Chicago Symphony Orchestra, for which Clyne was then composer-in-residence.  It was first performed on March 21, 2011, at Symphony Center, Chicago by the brass section of the Chicago Symphony Orchestra.

Composition
Clyne was inspired to write the piece by the "powerhouse" brass section of the Chicago Symphony Orchestra.  She later described the experience as "an opportunity to take a stab at writing for such an ensemble for the first time."

The title of the work comes from the book Spangled Unicorn by Noël Coward, which Clyne spotted while shopping at a Chicago bookstore.  Clyne wrote in the score program notes, "I scooped it up, but alas, none of the poems made even the slightest of references to a unicorn of a spangly nature. So, I instead turned to the young writers Helena McBurney (age 11) and Charlotte McBurney (age 9) who created their very own stories about this magical beast. I then spliced their two stories and reassembled them to form one story..."  A tape of the girls reading this story can be played as an optional accompaniment to the piece.

Instrumentation
The work is scored for a brass ensemble consisting of three horns, three trumpets, three trombones, and a tuba.

Reception
Reviewing the world premiere, Lawrence A. Johnson of the Chicago Classical Voice called the piece "well-crafted, virtuosic and written with great flair and a quirky off-center humor".  He added:
Conversely, Evan Kuchar of ChicagoNow called Spangled Unicorn "a big disappointment" and described it as "banal ideas combined in boring ways—and then brought back a second time. There's some fanfare, a waltz that hangs around for too long, and there's even a polka that sounded like one of Brahms' Hungarian Dances. Not unicorny at all; just corny. And nothing dreamy about it."

References

Compositions by Anna Clyne
2011 compositions
Chamber music compositions
Music commissioned by the Chicago Symphony Orchestra